The Milwaukee Brewers Radio Network (branded as the Brewers Radio Network) is a 33-station radio network in Wisconsin and Michigan that broadcasts baseball games and related programming for the Milwaukee Brewers of Major League Baseball, and is operated in lieu of the Brewers by Good Karma Brands. The network's flagship is WTMJ/620 in Milwaukee, Wisconsin, which was purchased by Good Karma Brands in 2018. WTMJ served as the flagship station for the network for all but three years of the Brewers' existence (the exceptions being WEMP in 1970 and WISN in 1981 and 1982).

Announcers
Hall of Fame member Bob Uecker has been part of the Brewers Radio Network since 1971. Jeff Levering has been part of the Brewers Radio Network since 2015. Lane Grindle has been part of the Brewers Radio Network since 2016. Josh Maurer joined the team to do road games in 2022.

Programming

Pre-game
The pre-game show is entitled as the On-Deck Show Built By Menards.

Post-game
The post-game show is entitled the Sartori Cheese Post Game Show, which is usually done by either by Levering or Grindle.

Stations

Affiliates (33 stations)

Wisconsin

Michigan

Bold denotes the Flagship station.

Source:

See also
List of Milwaukee Brewers broadcasters

References

Milwaukee Brewers
Major League Baseball on the radio
Sports radio networks in the United States